Rezső Wanié (12 April 1908 – 9 April 1986) was a Hungarian swimmer who competed in the 1928 Summer Olympics. He was born in Szeged. In the 1928 he was a member of the Hungarian team which finished fourth in the 4 × 200 m freestyle relay event. In the 100 m freestyle competition he was eliminated in the semi-finals and in the 400 m freestyle contest he was eliminated in the first round.

External links
Rezső Wanié's profile at Sports Reference.com

1908 births
1986 deaths
Hungarian male swimmers
Hungarian male freestyle swimmers
Olympic swimmers of Hungary
Swimmers at the 1928 Summer Olympics
European Aquatics Championships medalists in swimming
Sportspeople from Szeged